The 1946 CCUNC Owls football team was an American football team that represented the Charlotte Center of the University of North Carolina or CCUNC (now known as the University of North Carolina at Charlotte) as an independent during the 1946 college football season. In their first season under head coach Arthur Deremer, the team compiled a 2–4 record. The Owls moniker was chosen by the players from the inaugural squad.

Schedule

References

CCUNC
Charlotte 49ers football seasons
CCUNC Owls football